John D'Arcy Keating (born December 12, 1952) is a Canadian former professional ice hockey player. He was selected by the Pittsburgh Penguins in the seventh round (104th overall) of the 1972 NHL Amateur Draft.

Keating played junior hockey with the Sault Ste. Marie Greyhounds, and attended the University of Notre Dame where he played NCAA Division I hockey with the Notre Dame Fighting Irish.

Keating began his professional career in the International Hockey League (IHL) with the Fort Wayne Komets, playing 28 regular-season games and 5 playoff contests during the 1972–73 season. He went on to play six seasons and 332 games in the IHL, scoring 101 goals and 150 assists for 251 points, while earning 235 penalty minutes. Keating was selected to play in the 1978 IHL All-Star Game, where he scored two goals.

Career statistics

References

External links

1952 births
Living people
Canadian ice hockey right wingers
Fort Wayne Komets players
Ice hockey people from Ontario
Milwaukee Admirals players
Notre Dame Fighting Irish men's ice hockey players
Pittsburgh Penguins draft picks
Sault Ste. Marie Greyhounds players
Sportspeople from Oshawa